Alexander Uber (1783–1824) was a German cello virtuoso, composer, and Kapellmeister; he was a student of Johannes Jäger.  Among his compositions are a cello concerto, a set of variations for cello and orchestra, several instrumental works, and some Lieder.  His brother Hermann was also a composer and Kapellmeister; the two were sons of a noted jurist and amateur musician, Christian Benjamin Uber.

Uber was born and died in Breslau.

External links
 

1783 births
1824 deaths
German classical cellists
German male composers
German composers
Musicians from Wrocław
19th-century German musicians
19th-century German male musicians